Francis Joseph "Frank, Duke" McCurry (June 13, 1900 – November 8, 1965) was a Canadian professional ice hockey left winger who played 145 games in the National Hockey League, with the Pittsburgh Pirates between 1925 and 1929.

Playing career
Born in Toronto, Ontario, McCurry played his junior hockey with the Toronto Canoe Club Paddlers in 1919-20 and led them to the 1920 Memorial Cup win with 21 goals and 32 points in 12 games.

He also played football for the Toronto Argonauts from 1922 to 1923, as well as captaining several baseball teams. McCurry was also a member of the all-star Canadian lacrosse team from 1920 to 1922, and was the welter-weight boxing champion of Canada in 1916.

From 1923 to 1925 he played in Pittsburgh with the USAHA's Pittsburgh Yellow Jackets. In September 1925, McCurry was signed as a free agent when the Yellow Jackets became the National Hockey League Pittsburgh Pirates, scoring 17 points in 36 games. McCurry remained with the Pirates for another three years but gradually lost his scoring touch, and in September 1929, the Pirates dealt him to the Montreal Maroons for cash. However, McCurry refused to report to Montreal and he sat out the entire season. Although it was evident the Pirates did not want him, he liked the city of Pittsburgh and signed a one-year pact with the Pittsburgh Yellow Jackets, now playing in the IHL. He retired from hockey after the 1930-31 season.

Post-playing career
After his athletic career, he retired to become a doctor. McCurry moved to Pittsburgh, Pennsylvania, and took up dentistry, before returning to Toronto, in the 1930s. McCurry died in 1965 at the St. Michael's Hospital in Toronto, Ontario.

Career statistics

Regular season and playoffs

External links

1900 births
1965 deaths
Canadian ice hockey left wingers
Ice hockey people from Ontario
People from Old Toronto
Pittsburgh Pirates (NHL) players
Pittsburgh Yellow Jackets (IHL) players
Pittsburgh Yellow Jackets (USAHA) players
Players of Canadian football from Ontario